Nico & Vinz are a Norwegian duo consisting of Kahouly Nicolay "Nico" Sereba from Holmlia, Oslo and Vincent "Vinzy V" Dery from Lambertseter, Oslo. They formed in 2010 as Envy but changed their name to Nico & Vinz by the end of 2012. They are commonly associated with their biggest hit single "Am I Wrong", which peaked at number 2 in Norway, Denmark and Sweden, and number 1 in the United Kingdom.

Music career

2010–11: Formation and debut mixtape 
Nicolay Sereba of Norwegian-Ivorian origin and Vincent Dery of Ghanaian origin created their music as a fusion of genres as diverse as pop to reggae to soul, having been exposed by the various musical influences of their parents with whom they did recurring trips to the West Coast of Africa. The duo was launched as Envy with its main debut appearance at Emergenza Festival in 2011. They won first place at the Taubertal Open Air Festival World's "Emergenza Final" for new emerging artists. Following that success, the duo released the mixtape Dreamworks: Why Not Me under the name Envy. The materials were also made available online through WiMP. Sereba speaks English, Norwegian and French. Dery speaks English, Norwegian and Dagaare.

In June 2011, the duo released their debut single "One Song" under the name Envy. The song peaked to number 19 on the Norwegian Singles Chart.

2011: The Magic Soup and the Bittersweet Faces 
Envy released their debut studio album The Magic Soup and the Bittersweet Faces on April 27, 2012, peaking to number 37 on the Norwegian Albums Chart. "One Song" was released as the lead single from the album peaking at number 19 on the Norwegian Singles Chart. It was followed by "Go Loud" released as a follow-up second and last single from the album.

2013–14: Breakthrough and "Am I Wrong" international success 
In April 2013, they released "Am I Wrong" after the duo changed their name from Envy to Nico & Vinz, in coordination with their signing to Warner Bros. Records in the United States to avoid being confused with other artists with a similar name. With international success of the single, the duo changed the credits of the single to the new adopted name. The song peaked to number 2 on the Norwegian Singles Chart and also peaked to number 2 on the Danish Singles Chart and number 2 on the Swedish Singles Chart. It also reached number one on the Mainstream Top 40 chart. It was followed up with another release "In Your Arms" which also charted in Norway, Denmark and Sweden.

The music video for "Am I Wrong" was directed and edited by African Folk music composer Kavar Singh. The video for "Am I Wrong" was filmed in Botswana and at the Victoria Falls between Zambia and Zimbabwe. It was put together in a deliberate effort to present a positive side of Africa when the image of the continent is too often mired in negative news stories. The music video was released via YouTube on June 20, 2013.

In early 2014, Nico & Vinz received the European Border Breakers Award (EBBA) at Eurosonic Festival, performed at the Spellemann Awards, completed a Scandinavian tour, and launched "Am I Wrong" worldwide. When "Am I Wrong" made its American radio debut in April 2014, it was the number one most added record at the mainstream radio format and it peaked at number 4 on the Billboard Hot 100. They performed "Am I Wrong" at the iHeartRadio Music Festival in Las Vegas, as well as for the television show Dancing with the Stars in Los Angeles.

Their album Black Star Elephant was released in September 2014, followed by the single "When the Day Comes" in October 2014.

Nico & Vinz were featured on a track of David Guetta's 2014 album Listen, named "Lift Me Up" along with South African group Ladysmith Black Mambazo.

Their song "Find a Way", featuring Emmanuel Jal, is featured in the film The Good Lie. "When the Day Comes" is featured the EA Sports game FIFA 15.

2015–present: Extended plays Cornerstone & Elephant in the Room
In October 2015, the duo released the EP Cornerstone. "That's How You Know", featuring Kid Ink and Bebe Rexha, was released as the first single from the EP and peaked at number 2 in both Norway and Australia. They also featured in Alesso's song "I Wanna Know".

Nico & Vinz then released "Hold It Together" in January 2016, which is taken from their third studio album, due later in 2016.

The second single from Cornerstone was "Praying to a God".

In November 2017, Nico & Vinz released their new EP Elephant In The Room including their new single "Intrigued" and "Listen".

They are working on a new album, as they told in 2019 in a podcast of LipRoll.

Honours 
2014: Spellemannprisen as this year's Spellemann

Discography 

Studio albums
 The Magic Soup and the Bittersweet Faces (2012) 
 Black Star Elephant (2014) 

Mixtapes
 Dreamworks: Why Not Me (2010) 

Extended plays
 Cornerstone (2015)
 Elephant in the room (2017)

References

External links 

Spellemannprisen winners
Norwegian musical duos
Norwegian hip hop groups
English-language singers from Norway
Norwegian people of Ghanaian descent
Norwegian people of Ivorian descent
Afrobeat musicians